The women's 100m butterfly S10 event at the 2012 Summer Paralympics took place at the  London Aquatics Centre on 1 September. There were two heats; the swimmers with the eight fastest times advanced to the final.

Results

Heats
Competed from 09:41.

Heat 1

Heat 2

Final
Competed at 17:37.

 
'Q = qualified for final. WR = World Record. EU = European Record.  DNS = Did not start.

References

 Official London 2012 Paralympics Results: Heats 
 Official London 2012 Paralympics Results: Final 

Swimming at the 2012 Summer Paralympics
2012 in women's swimming